Eachchamoddai Grama Niladhari Division is a Grama Niladhari Division of the Jaffna Divisional Secretariat  of Jaffna District  of Northern Province, Sri Lanka .  It has Grama Niladhari Division Code J/66.

Vannankulam, Jaffna, Passaiyoor, Chundikuli Girls' College, Gurunagar, Chundikuli, Old Park and St. John's College, Jaffna  are located within, nearby or associated with Eachchamoddai.

Eachchamoddai is a surrounded by the Passaiyoor West, Chundikuli South, Columbuthurai West, Columbuthurai West, Ariyalai S. W. (East), Passaiyoor East, Thirunagar and Chundikuli North  Grama Niladhari Divisions.

Demographics

Ethnicity 

The Eachchamoddai Grama Niladhari Division has a Sri Lankan Tamil majority (98.7%) . In comparison, the Jaffna Divisional Secretariat (which contains the Eachchamoddai Grama Niladhari Division) has a Sri Lankan Tamil majority (95.6%)

Religion 

The Eachchamoddai Grama Niladhari Division has a Roman Catholic majority (53.7%) and a significant Hindu population (38.6%) . In comparison, the Jaffna Divisional Secretariat (which contains the Eachchamoddai Grama Niladhari Division) has a Roman Catholic majority (52.9%) and a significant Hindu population (37.7%)

Gallery

References 

Grama Niladhari divisions of Sri Lanka
Jaffna District